Austin Public Library is a public library system serving Austin, Texas, United States. It is operated by the City of Austin and consists of the Central Library on Cesar Chavez Street (which replaced the old Faulk Central Library in 2017), the Austin History Center, 20 branches and the Recycled Reads bookstore and upcycling facility.

History 
On November 13, 1925, Grace Delano Clark persuaded the Austin Branch of American Association of University Women (AAUW) to initiate a project to establish the Austin Public Library.

AAUW organized a house-to-house campaign to solicit book donations and money for a dedicated building.  In February 1926, the Austin Public Library opened at 819 Congress Avenue in a rented room above the office of newspaper Pressler & Ziller. The library held 500 donated volumes, and Grace Delano Clark served as Volunteer Librarian. In December of the same year, Austin's first library building, an  wood-frame structure, opened at West 9th and Guadalupe Streets.

In 1928, Austin voters approved $150,000 in bonds for a permanent building, and the temporary building was moved to Angelina Street, resurfaced with brick, and opened as the library's first branch, the George Washington Carver Branch. The building is now part of the George Washington Carver Museum, adjacent to the current Carver Branch.

From 1933 until 1951 library services were provided on a racially segregated basis.  The small George Washington Carver branch was designated as the facility to serve Blacks.   They were not welcome at any other library facility, although they could request library materials to be sent to Carver.  William Astor Kirk, a professor at Huston–Tillotson University, challenged this arrangement. By the end of 1951 the segregation policy was ended.

The new, permanent building was to be designed by Austin architect Hugo Kuehne, and construction began in 1932. The building took advantage of local materials and craftsmen. Texas “Cordova” cream limestone was selected to achieve the Italian Renaissance Revival style of the building. Ornamental wrought iron work was created by Fortunat Weigl to enhance the balconies, doors and windows. Peter Mansbendel, a Swiss master woodcarver who immigrated to Texas in 1911, carved much of the interior woodwork. Bubi Jessen and Peter Alidi painted the tracery frescoes on the ceiling of the arched loggia on the north side of the building.

In March 1933, the new building opened at West 9th and Guadalupe. This building served as the main library from 1933 until 1979, when construction of the John Henry Faulk Central Library next door was complete. At that time, the newly formed Austin History Center Association consolidated community support to renovate the old central library building to house the expanding Austin-Travis County Collection. In 1983, the Austin-Travis County Collection formally became the Austin History Center.

Central Library 

In 1972, Austin voters passed a $6 million bond for a new central library to be built on an adjacent site at West 8th and Guadalupe. Jessen Associates, founded by Bubi Jessen and Wolf Juessen, designed this central library in the New Formalist style under the direction of architect Fred Day. Construction began in 1976, and the building opened to the public on April 11, 1979. John Henry Faulk, a local writer and free speech advocate who would be the building's namesake, was the keynote speaker at the dedication ceremony on August 26, 1979.

In the spring of 2013, the City of Austin broke ground on a 6-story new central library overlooking Shoal Creek and Lady Bird Lake, funded in large part by a bond program approved by Austin voters in 2006. The building is part of the city's extensive redevelopment of the former Seaholm Power Plant site, east of the intersection of Lamar Boulevard and Cesar Chavez Street. It opened to the public on Saturday October 28, 2017. The building was designed by a joint venture of San Antonio-based Lake Flato Architects, known for their energy-efficient and sustainable projects; and Boston-based Shepley Bulfinch, successor to the firm founded by 19th century architect Henry Hobson Richardson. The new central library offers a living rooftop garden, reading porches, an indoor reading room and a bicycle corral, large indoor and outdoor event spaces, a gift shop, an art gallery and a café run by the ELM Restaurant Group.

In April 2018, Austin Public Library hosted their first Kids Block Party. The event encourages families with children to promote learning through play and fosters a love of reading.

Branch Libraries
In addition to the Central Library and the Austin History Center, the Austin Public Library has 20 branches and a Recycled Reads bookstore and upcycling facility. The APL library system also has mobile libraries – bookmobile buses and a human-powered trike and trailer called "unbound: sin fronteras".
 Carver Branch
 Cepeda Branch
 Hampton Branch at Oak Hill
 Howson Branch 
 Little Walnut Creek Branch 
 Manchaca Road Branch
 Milwood Branch
 North Village Branch
 Old Quarry Branch
 Pleasant Hill Branch
 Ruiz Branch
 St. John Branch
 Southeast Austin Community Branch
 Spicewood Springs Branch
 Henry Terrazas Branch
 Twin Oaks Branch
 University Hills Branch
 Willie Mae Kirk Branch (formerly Oak Springs Branch)
 Windsor Park Branch
 Yarborough Branch

References

External links

 Austin Public Library

Public libraries in Texas
Public Library
Libraries established in 1926
Libraries participating in TexShare